Post-amendment to the Tamil Nadu Entertainments Tax Act 1939 on 1 April 1958, Gross jumped to 140 per cent of Nett Commercial Taxes Department disclosed 18.59 crore in entertainment tax revenue for the year.

The following is a list of films produced in the Tamil film industry in India in 1975, in alphabetical order.

1975

References

Films, Tamil
Lists of 1975 films by country or language
1975
1970s Tamil-language films